The men's lightweight event was part of the boxing programme at the 1924 Summer Olympics. The weight class was the fourth-lightest contested, and allowed boxers of up to 135.5 pounds (61.2 kilograms). The competition was held from July 16, 1924 to July 20, 1924. 30 boxers from 22 nations competed.

Results

Notes

References

 official report
 

Lightweight